The name Nancy has been used for a total of nineteen tropical cyclones worldwide: fourteen in the Western Pacific Ocean, one in the Southwest Indian Ocean and four in the Southwestern Pacific Ocean.

Western Pacific 
 Tropical Storm Nancy (1945)
 Tropical Storm Nancy (1950) (Japan Meteorological Agency analyzed it as a tropical depression, not as a tropical storm.)
 Typhoon Nancy (1954) (T5416)
 Typhoon Nancy (1958) (T5828)
 Typhoon Nancy (1961) – (T6118, 52W) struck Japan. Known as 2nd Muroto Typhoon.
 Tropical Storm Nancy (1964) (21W, Japan Meteorological Agency analyzed it as a tropical depression, not as a tropical storm.)
 Tropical Storm Nancy (1966) (T6633, 36W, Uding)
 Typhoon Nancy (1970) (T7001, 01W, Atang)
 Typhoon Nancy (1972) (T7225, 27W)
 Tropical Storm Nancy (1976) (T7604, 04W)
 Tropical Storm Nancy (1979) (T7915, 18W)
 Typhoon Nancy (1982) (T8222, 24W, Weling) – struck Philippines.
 Typhoon Nancy (1986) (T8605, 05W) – struck Taiwan.
 Typhoon Nancy (1989) (T8914, 17W)

Southwest Indian Ocean 
 Cyclone Nancy (1965)

Southwest Pacific Ocean 
 Cyclone Nancy (1966)
 Cyclone Nancy (1977)
 Cyclone Nancy (1990) – made landfall near Byron Bay.
 Cyclone Nancy (2005) – a Category 4 tropical cyclone whose damage warranted retirement of the name.

Pacific typhoon set index articles
South-West Indian Ocean cyclone set index articles
Australian region cyclone set index articles
South Pacific cyclone set index articles